Pitti Island may refer to:
Pitti, an island on Pitti Bank, 24 km north of Kavaratti, Lakshadweep, India
Pitti (Kalpeni), another small island in Lakshadweep, India which is part of the Kalpeni Atoll
Pitti (Suheli), a long sandbank in Suheli Par, India